Tarot is a 1986 West German drama film directed by Rudolf Thome. It is loosely based on Johann Wolfgang von Goethe's 1809 novel Elective Affinities. It was entered into the 15th Moscow International Film Festival.

Cast
 Vera Tschechowa as Charlotte
 Rüdiger Vogler as Otto
 Hanns Zischler as Eduard
 Katharina Böhm as Ottilie
 William Berger as Mittler
 Kerstin Eiblmeier as Nanni
 Martin Kern as Baby
 George Tabori as Theaterregisseur
 Willem Menne as Schauspieler (as Wilhelm Menne)

References

External links
 

1986 films
1986 drama films
1980s German-language films
Films based on German novels
Films based on works by Johann Wolfgang von Goethe
German drama films
West German films
1980s German films